Four Japanese destroyers have borne the name Harusame:

  was a  launched in 1902 and wrecked in 1911.
  was a  launched in 1935 and sunk  in 1944.
  was a  launched in 1959 and stricken in 1989.
  is a  launched in 1995.

Imperial Japanese Navy ship names
Japan Maritime Self-Defense Force ship names
Japanese Navy ship names